Justicia carnea, the Brazilian plume flower, Brazilian-plume, flamingo flower, or jacobinia, is a flowering plant in the family Acanthaceae.

The perennial plant is native to the Atlantic Forest ecoregions of eastern Brazil.

It is cultivated and sold as a decorative potted plant and is planted in landscaping as a feature plant in warm temperate and subtropical climates.

See also
 List of plants of Atlantic Forest vegetation of Brazil
 Justicia — common names include water-willow and shrimp plant.
 Ecoregions of the Atlantic Forest biome

References

External links

carnea
Endemic flora of Brazil
Flora of the Atlantic Forest
Plants described in 1831